Herman Darewski (17 April 1883 – 2 June 1947) was a British composer and conductor of light music.  His most successful work was perhaps The Better 'Ole, which ran for over 800 performances in its original London production in 1917.  Some of his songs became very successful in musical revues.

Born in Minsk, and musically trained in Vienna, he worked in London, for the first 15 years of the new century, as a composer of light songs, some of which were written for the new theatre form, revue.  After the First World War, Darewski had a long career as a conductor of light music, both in London and at English coastal resorts.

Life and career
Darewski was born in Minsk, then part of the Russian empire, where his father Eduard Darewski, a Polish singing professor, was working. The family moved to London, where Herman was educated. He studied at the London College of Music, where he distinguished himself as a piano student, passing examinations in record time. One of his brothers was the theatre producer Ernest C. Rolls, and his younger brother Max (1894–1929) followed him into the musical profession. Herman went to Vienna to study music, between 1897 and 1900. He was engaged by the London music publishers Francis, Day and Hunter as one of their composing staff. He remained with them for 15 years.

In 1914 he visited Australia with his wife, the musical comedy actress Madge Temple, who was playing leading roles there. After his return to Britain during the First World War, Darewski combined administrative work for charities and prolific composition. He was one of the first British composers to compose for the new theatrical form, revue, writing, among others, Business as Usual and Push and Go for Albert de Courville, and The Better 'Ole and Carminetta for Charles B. Cochran. Among Darewski's songs are "Sister Susie's Sewing Shirts for Soldiers", "The Big Brass Band", and "Ours is a Nice 'Ouse Ours Is."  He also wrote songs for the London production of Phi-Phi.

After the war, a brief and unsuccessful attempt to strike out on his own as a publisher was followed by a new career as the conductor of light music orchestras. The Times wrote, "When British light orchestras were being ousted wholesale by foreign competition, he gave them new life, and was the precursor of men like Mr. Jack Hylton and Mr. Debroy Somers." Between 1924 and 1937 he was in charge of the music at the resorts of Bridlington and Blackpool, with an interval in 1930 to 1932 when he conducted at one of London's largest cinemas.

Darewski died in London at the age of 64.

Notes

1883 births
1947 deaths
British musical theatre composers
English composers